The Shoranur–Mangaluru section is a railway segment of IR functioning under Palakkad Division of Southern Railway Zone.  This is a  broad gauge electrified line which begins at the Shornur Junction railway station in Kerala and ends at the Mangaluru Central railway station in Karnataka.  This line passes through  major towns including Tirur, Kozhikode, Vatakara, Thalassery, Kannur, Payyannur, Kanhangad and Kasaragod.

This line covers entire Districts of Malabar region in Kerala except Wayanad district and terminates at Dakshina Kannada District of Karnataka after crossing the Nethravathi River.

The Shoranur–Mangaluru section is a strategic route and the lifeline of Malabar's economy that interconnects the important cities of this regions and also serves as a threshold to Tulu Nadu, Konkan and Mumbai from Kerala.

References

Rail transport in Kerala
Rail transport in Karnataka
5 ft 6 in gauge railways in India